A Home of Our Own is a 1993 American comedy drama film directed by Tony Bill, starring Kathy Bates and Edward Furlong. It is the story of a mother and her six children trying to establish a home in the small fictional town of Hankston, Idaho, in 1962.

Plot
Frances Lacey, a widow, works at a factory that produces potato chips.  She is fired when one of the men gropes her, and she hits him in return.  The same day, her son is brought home by the police, for stealing change from payphones, but they don't press charges.  Shortly after this, Frances decides that Los Angeles is not the place to raise a family.  She packs the kids up, sells everything they can't carry, and starts driving.  She figures she'll know where she's going when she sees it.  Their meager resources get them as far as Hankston, Idaho, where Frances spots the unfinished frame of a wood house a few miles outside town, across the road from Moon's Nursery.  Finding that the proprietor of the nursery, Mr. Munimura, is the owner of the property, though virtually penniless, Frances proposes to buy it from him in exchange for work by her and her children, whom she collectively calls the "Lacey Tribe".

With winter approaching, the Laceys work hard to make the house habitable.  Frances finds a job as a waitress in the coffee shop at a bowling alley in Hankston and puts every dollar she can spare into improvement of the house.  Murray inadvertently burns the house down in the dead of winter, and the family loses everything they own.

The family is picking through the charred remains of the house when Frances finds their meager savings in a blackened jar. Hope is reborn for Frances, but eldest son Shayne angrily demands a reality check and even accuses her of putting her pride ahead of the family's needs. When rebuilding seems impossible, Mr. Munimura arrives with professional town folk and supplies to rebuild. Whether stubborn independent Frances likes it or not, rebuilding has started as Mr. Munimura gives her a comforting hug.  Frances relents, but true to character, she states that all will be paid back.  Toys, clothes, and blankets are also provided for the children.  Frances only lets them build the house as far as it was before the fire. Shayne, narrating, says that it took them six months to finish the rest of the house, and four years to pay everyone back, but that it brought them all closer together as a family.  Even though he hated Idaho at first, he still lives there, and has never been back to Los Angeles.

Cast

Production
Screenwriter Patrick Sheane Duncan based the story on his own childhood experiences as one of twelve children growing up in the Midwest with a single mother. 

Principal photography began on October 26, 1992, and concluded on December 19. Parts of the film were shot in Heber, Wasatch Mountain State Park and Midvale, Utah.

Critical reception 
Roger Ebert awarded the film 3 out of 4 stars and wrote, "This situation, set in the 1950s, could be the set-up for a sitcom, or a retread of an old Disney family yarn. It ends up being a lot more, partly because Kathy Bates brings a solid, no-nonsense clarity to what could have been a marshmallow role, and partly because the director, Tony Bill, is too smart to go for heart-wrenching payoffs until the very end of the film, when they work so well that I actually felt some tears in my eyes." He concluded "This is not a great movie, but it has a big heart."

Other reviews criticized the film for its overt sentimentality and manipulativeness.

References

External links
 
 
 

1993 films
1993 drama films
1993 independent films
American drama films
American independent films
Films about children
Films about families
Films about poverty in the United States
Films about siblings
Films about widowhood
Films scored by Michael Convertino
Films set in 1962
Films set in Idaho
Films shot in Utah
Gramercy Pictures films
PolyGram Filmed Entertainment films
Films directed by Tony Bill
1990s English-language films
1990s American films